The West Oahu CaneFires were a minor league baseball team in the Hawaii Winter Baseball league. They were based in Waipahu, Hawaii. The name CaneFires is derived from the burning of sugar cane before harvest on many plantations on the island of Oahu. They played their home games at Hans L'Orange Field.

The CaneFires began as the Kauai Emeralds, but changed their name when they moved to Oahu in 1995.

Notable players

 Gabe Kapler (born 1975), major league baseball outfielder and manager, 2021 NL Manager of the Year
Kenley Jansen, Atlanta Braves relief pitcher

Team record

References

1993 establishments in Hawaii
Baseball teams established in 1993
2008 disestablishments in Hawaii
Baseball teams disestablished in 2008
Defunct Hawaii Winter Baseball teams
Defunct baseball teams in Hawaii